Bárcena or Barcena may refer to:

Alicia Bárcena Ibarra (born 1952), Mexican biologist and the United Nations Executive Secretary of ECLAC
Alonzo de Barcena (1528–1598), Spanish Jesuit missionary and linguist
Bárcena de Campos, a municipality in the province of Palencia, Castile and León, Spain
Bárcena de Cicero, a municipality in the autonomous community of Cantabria, Spain
Bárcena de Pie de Concha, a municipality in the autonomous community of Cantabria, Spain
Volcán Bárcena, a Mexican volcano